Edith Lambert Sharp (March 7, 1911 – July 2, 1974) was a Canadian professional woman, writing teacher, and writer. She won the annual Governor General's Award for juvenile fiction in 1958, recognizing the historical novel Nkwala as the year's best Canadian book.

Life 
She was born near Carroll, Manitoba, daughter of Charles Lambert and Edna Louise (Maloan) Sharp. She dropped out of high school in Penticton, British Columbia, after one year. She attended the Vancouver School of Art and took private studies from the Smithsonian Institution to develop her artistic talents.

Sharp worked as a director of the Okanagan Summer School of the Arts, as well as teaching creative writing in night and summer schools. She also became involved in politics and served years as secretary to the riding associations of the local Progressive Conservative Party.

Sharp was a member of the Penticton Board of Trade, an honorary member of the Business and Professional Women's Club, the Conservative Party, and the Anglican Church of Canada. She died in British Columbia in 1974.

Selected works 
 Nkwala, illustrated by William Winter (Little, Brown, 1958),  – Governor General's Award for Juvenile Fiction

Nkwala is a researched juvenile novel about the pre-colonial Okanagan people of the Interior of British Columbia.

References

External links

 

1911 births
Canadian Anglicans
Canadian children's writers
Governor General's Award-winning children's writers
People from Westman Region, Manitoba
Emily Carr University of Art and Design alumni
1974 deaths